In the United States, the definition of cider can be more broadly defined than in Europe, specifically Ireland and the UK. There are two types of cider: one being the traditional fermented product, called hard cider, and the second sweet or soft cider.  Sparkling cider is also sometimes used as a nonalcoholic version of champagne. Within the broad 'hard cider' category, there are a number of subcategories - Modern Cider - primarily made with culinary apples, Heritage Cider - primarily made with cider specific fruit, Traditional Cider - made in the style of English or French cider, and Fruit Cider - with non-pomme fruits or juice added. There are additional categories such as hopped cider, botanical cider, rose cider, spiced cider, wood-aged cider, sour cider, ice cider, New England style cider, and specialty or unlimited cider.

Cideries by state

Alabama
 Avondale Brewing Company – Birmingham
 Dixie Southern Cidery – Florence
 Red Clay Brewing Company – Opelika

Alaska
 Alaska Ciderworks –  Talkeetna
 Cultivar Cider Company –  Anchorage
 Double Shovel Cider Co. –  Anchorage
 Lat 65 Brewing Company –  Fairbanks
 Sweetgale Meadworks & Cider House –  Homer
 Wild North Spiked Cider –  Anchorage, Eagle River, Palmer

Arizona
 Arizona Mead Company – Chandler
 Bawker Bawker Cider House – Tucson
 Cider Corps – Meza
 Crush Craft Cider Company – Tempe
 Headbanger Cider - Desert Rock Winery – Scottsdale
 Stoic Cider – Prescott
 Superstition Meadery – Prescott, Phoenix
 The Meading Room – Sonoita

Arkansas
 Black Apple Hard Cider – Bentonville, Springdale

California
 101 Cider House – Westlake Village
 Ace Cider – Sebastopol
 AppleGarden Farm – Petaluma
 Bite Hard Cider – CLOSED
 Bonny Doon Vineyard – Davenport
 Bristol's Cider House – Atascadero
 Brooks Dry Cider – San Francisco
 Calico Cidery – Julian
 California Cider Company – Sebastopol
 Casa Dumetz Wines – Los Alamos
 Cider Brothers – Walnut Creek
 Common Cider Company – Auburn
 Coturri Winery – Glen Ellen
 Crispin Cider Company – Colfax
 Crooked City Cider – Oakland
 Devoto Orchards Cider – Sebastopol
 Dreamcôte Wine Co. – Los Olivos
 Drew Family Cellars – Elk
 Far West Cider – Richmond
 Foxcraft Hard Cider – Santa Rosa
 Goat Rock Cider Co - Healdsburg
 Golden State Cider – Graton
 Gowan's Heirloom Ciders – Philo
 Guthrie CiderWorks - San Diego
 Hemly Cider – Courtland
 Hidden Star Orchards – Lodi
 Honest Abe Cidery – Carson
 Horse & Plow – Sebastopol
 Humboldt Cider Company – Eureka
 Indigeny Reserve – Sonora
 Jack Russell Farm Brewery – Camino
 Jean Marie Cidery – Paso Robles
 Julian Ciderworks – Julian
 Julian Hard Cider - Julian
 Krazy Farm Cider Co. – Aptos
 Lassen Traditional Cider – Chico
 Meraki Cider – Pismo Beach
 Mission-Trail Cider Company – Bradley
 Newtopia Cyder – San Diego
 Philo Apple Farm – Philo
 Ratel Cider – Monterey
 Red Branch Cider & Brewing Company – Sunnyvale
 Redwood Coast Cider – San Carlos
 Reef Points Hard Cider – Cayucos
 Rider Ranch Ciderworks – Los Gatos
 Santa Cruz Cider Company – Santa Cruz
 Scar of the Sea – Santa Maria
 See Canyon Hard Cider – San Luis Obispo
 Serpentine Cider – San Diego
 Sierra Cider – Mariposa
 Snow-Line Orchard – Yucaipa
 Sonoma Cider – CLOSED
 Soquel Cider – Soquel
 South City Cider – San Bruno
 Specific Gravity Cider – Sebastopol
 Surf City Cider – Felton
 Sutton Cellars – San Francisco
 Tag + Jug Cider Co. – San Francisco
 The Apiary Ciderworks & Meadery – Carpinteria
 Three Thinkers Cider - Sierraville
 Tilted Shed Ciderworks – Windsor
 Tin City Cider – Paso Robles
 Troy Cider – Fulton
 Turquoise Barn Cider – Ramona
 Twisted Horn Mead & Cider – Vista
 Two Rivers Cider Co. – Sacramento
 Wildcide Hard Cider – San Jose
 Wrangletown Cider Company – Arcata

Colorado
 Apple Valley Cider Company – Penrose 
 Big B's Hard Cider – Hotchkiss
 Branch Out Cider – Fort Collins
 C Squared Ciders – Denver
 Clear Fork Cider – Denver
 Climb Hard Cider Co. – Loveland
 Colorado Cider Company – Denver
 Colorado Common Hard Cider – Colorado Springs
 Fenceline Cider – Durango
 Haykin Family Cider – Aurora
 Ice Cave Cider House – Monument
 Jack Rabbit Hill – Hotchkiss
 Snow Capped Cider – Cedaredge
 St. Vrain Cidery – Longmont
 Stem Ciders – Denver
 Summit Hard Cider – Fort Collins
 Talbott's Cider Company – Palisade
 The Infinite Monkey Theorem – Denver
 The Old Mine Cidery & Brewpub – Erie
 Wild Cider – Firestone

Connecticut
 Averill Farm – Washington Depot
 B.F. Clyde's Cider Mill - Mystic
 Bishop's Orchards Winery – Guilford
 Bushy Hill Cidery – Granby
 Crazy Cock Cider – Stafford Springs
 Hogan's Cider Mill – Burlington
 Holmberg Orchards & Winery – Gales Ferry
 Lyman Orchard – Middlefield
 New England Cider Company – Wallingford
 Spoke + Spy Ciderworks – Middletown
 Tree House Orchard & Farm Fermentory – Woodstock
 Yankee Cider Company - East Haddam

Delaware
 Liquid Alchemy Beverages – Wilmington
 Rebel Seed Cidery – Marydel
 The Brimming Horn Meadery – Milton
 Wilmington Brew Works – Wilmington

Florida

 3 Daughters Brewing – St. Petersburg
 3 Keys Brewery and Eatery – Bradenton
 Accomplice Brewery & Ciderworks – West Palm Beach
 Bone Sack Cider Company – St. Cloud
 Broski Ciderworks – Pompano Beach
 Caribé Tropical Hard Cider - Florida Beer Co. – Canaveral
 Cigar City Cider & Mead – Tampa
 Congaree and Penn - Farm Cider – Jacksonville
 Green Bench Mead & Cider – St. Petersburg
 Keel Farms Agrarian Ales + Ciders - Plant City
 Khoffner Brewery & Cidery - Fort Lauderdale
 Pierced Ciderworks - Fort Pierce
 Pedaler's Hard Cider - Quantum Leap Winery – Orlando

Georgia
 Atlanta Hard Cider Company – Marietta
 Mercier Orchards – Blue Ridge
 Treehorn Cider – Marietta
 Urban Tree Cidery – Atlanta

Hawaii
 Paradise Ciders – Honolulu

Idaho
 Cedar Draw Cider – Buhl
 Edge Brewing Company – Boise
 Highpoint Cider – Victor
 Meriwether Cider Company – Garden City, Boise
 North Idaho Cider – Hayden
 Stack Rock Cidery – Boise

Illinois
 2 Fools Cider – Naperville
 Apple Knocker Hard Cider - Owl Creek Vineyard – Cobden
 Broken Brix – St. Charles
 Eckert's Cider Shed – Belleville
 Eris Brewery and Cider House – Chicago
 Farmheads Cider Farm – Evanston
 Jonasmack Hard Cider – Malta
 Kuipers Hard Cider – Maple Park
 Overgrown Orchard  – Chicago
 Prima Cider – Long Grove
 Right Bee Cider – Chicago
 Stiffy's Hard Cider - Land of Lincoln Winery – Peoria
 The Northman – Chicago
 Von Jakob Winery & Brewery – Alto Pass

Indiana
 Aftermath Cidery & Winery – Valparaiso
 Ambrosia Orchard, Cidery, and Meadery – Hoagland
 Ash & Elm Cider Co. – Indianapolis
 Beanblossom Hard Cider - Oliver Winery – Bloomington
 Friendly Beasts Cider Company – Bloomington
 Kekionga Cider Company – Fort Wayne
 McClure's Orchard & Winery – Peru
 Misbeehavin' Meads – Valparaiso
 New Day Craft Mead & Cider – Indianapolis
 Sin City Cider - Sycamore Winery – West Terre Haute

Iowa
 BridgeHouse Cider LLC – Long Grove
 Convergence CiderWorks – Decorah
 Deal's Orchard Hard Cider – Jefferson
 Ditmar's Orchard & Vineyard – Council Bluffs
 Empty Nest Winery – Waukon
 Fishback & Stephenson Cider House – Fairfield
 Ghost Pig - Soldier Creek Winery – Fort Dodge
 Jacked Up Hard Cider - Crimson Sunset Cidery – Cascade
 Jefferson County Ciderworks – Fairfield
 Penoach Vineyard and Winery – Adel
 Sacrilegious Ciderworks – Glenwood
 Sutliff Cider Company – Lisbon
 Wilson's Orchard Hard Cider – Iowa City
 Winterset Cidery – Winterset

Kansas
 Bodine Wine Company – Wamego
 Dave & Dani Craft Cider – Manhattan
 KC Wine Co – Olathe
 Louisburg Cider Mill – Louisburg
 Meadowlark Farm Orchard & Cidery – Rose Hill
 Stone Pillar Vineyard & Winery – Olathe
 Trivedi Wine LLC – Lawrence
 Twin Rivers Winery and Gourmet Shoppe – Emporia
 White Crow Cider Company – Wichita

Kentucky
 Country Boy Brewing – Georgetown, Lexington
 Pivot Brewing Company – Lexington
 The Vault - Bum Ditty Hard Cider – Harrodsburg
 Wise Bird Cider Co. – Lexington

Louisiana
 Broad Street Cider – New Orleans
 Kingfish Cider – Jefferson

Maine
 Absolem Cider Company – Winthrop
 After Harvest Cider Company – Acton
 Après – Portland
 Ayuh Cidah – Farmington
 Bent Bough Cider – Newburgh Center
 Cornish Cider Company – Cornish
 Fogtown Brewing Company – Ellsworth
 Freedom's Edge Cider – Albion
 Kennebec Cider Company – Winthrop
 Norumbega Cidery – New Gloucester
 Orchard Girls Cidery – Kingsfield
 Portersfield Cider – Pownal
 Ricker Hill Mainiac Hard Cider – Turner
 Rocky Ground Cider – Newburgh
 Stone Tree Farm & Cidery – Unity
 Sweetgrass Farm Winery and Distillery – Union
 Tin Top Cider Co. – Alna
 Urban Farm Fermentory & Gruit Brewing Co. – Portland
 Whaleback Farm Cider – Lincolnville
 Winterport Winery – Winterport

Maryland
 Branch Bender Cidery – Accident
 Chesapeake Cider Co. – Baltimore
 Distillery Lane Ciderworks – Jefferson
 Doc Waters Cidery – Germantown
 Faulkner Branch Cidery & Distilling Co. – Federalsburg
 Free State Ciders – Great Mills
 Great Shoals Winery – St. Michaels
 Red Shedman Farm Brewery – Mount Airy
 Two Story Chimney Ciderworks – Laytonsville
 Willow Oaks Craft Cider – Middletown
 (see also: Charm City Meadworks – Baltimore and Mobtown Fermentation – Lutherville-Timonium)

Massachusetts
 Artifact Cider Project – Florence, Cambridge
 Bear Swamp Orchard and Cidery – Ashfield
 Berkshire Cider Project – North Adams
 Bolton Beer Works – Bolton
 Carlson Orchards, Inc – Harvard
 Carr's Ciderhouse – Hadley
 Cider Hill Cellars – Amesbury
 Common Ground Ciderworks – North Brookfield
 Downeast Cider House – East Boston
 Easthampton Cider Project – Palmer
 Far From The Tree – Salem
 Green River Ambrosia – Greenfield
 Headwater Cider – Hawley
 High Limb Hard Cider – Plymouth
 Honey Pot Hill Orchards – Stow
 House Bear Brewing – Newburyport
 JMASH Ciderhouse - Hilltop Orchards – Richmond
 Lookout Farm - Belkin Farm – Natick
 Muse Cider Bar – Haydenville
 New Salem Cider – New Salem
 Outlook Farm Ciderhouse – Westhampton
 Pony Shack Cider – Boxborough
 Ragged Hill Cider Company – West Brookfield
 Red Apple Farm - Brew Barn & Cidery – Phillipston
 Russell Orchards – Ipswich
 Shoal Hope Ciderworks – Hyannis
 Stoneybrook Cider – South Hadley
 Stormalong Cider – Sherborn
 West County Cider – Shelburne Falls

Michigan
 45 North Vineyard & Winery – Lake Leelanau
 Acme Cider Co. – Ada
 Almar Orchards – Flushing
 Appleholic Cider Company – Leland
 B. Nektar Meadery – Ferndale
 Bee Well Meadery – Bellaire
 Bel Lago Winery – Cedar
 Bennett's Orchard – Ottawa Lake
 Big Belly Ciderworks – Empire
 bigLITTLE Wines – Suttons Bay
 Black Star Farms – Suttons Bay
 Blake's Hard Cider Co. – Armada
 Blustone Vineyards – Lake Leelanau
 Bowers Harbor Vineyards – Traverse City
 Cellar Brewing Company – Sparta
 Cellarmen's – Hazel Park
 Cherry Creek Cellars – Albion
 Cherry Republic – Traverse City
 Corey Lake Orchards – Three Rivers
 Country Mill Winery – Charlotte
 Crane's Pie Pantry – Fennville
 Douglas Valley – Manistee
 Eastman's Forgotten Ciders – Wheeler
 Farmhaus Cider Co. – Hudsonville
 Fenn Valley Vineyards – Fennville
 Fieldstone Hard Cider – Rochester
 Flint City Hard Cider Co. – Flint
 Forbidden Fruit Cider – Paw Paw
 Fourth Coast Ciderworks – Lake Orion
 Green Bird Cellars – Northport
 Husted's Farm Market – Kalamazoo
 J. Trees Cellars – Tecumseh
 JK's Farmhouse Ciders – Flushing
 Kuhnhenn Brewing Co. – Warren
 L.Mawby – Suttons Bay
 Lansing Brewing Company – Lansing
 Left Foot Charley – Traverse City
 Lehman's Orchards – Niles
 Mackinaw Trail Winery & Brewery – Petoskey
 McIntosh Cellars – South Haven
 Meckley's Cidery – Cement City
 Michigan Wine Company – Grandville
 Motor City Brewing Works – Detroit
 Nomad Cidery – Traverse City
 Northern Natural Cider House & Winery – Kaleva
 Northville Winery and Brewing Company – Northville 
 Odd Brothers Craft Cider – Homer
 Ore Creek Craft Cider- Pinckney, MI
 Painted Turtle Hard Cider – Lowell
 Petoskey Brewing – Petoskey
 Phillips Ciders – St. Johns
 Pux Cider – Conkin 
 Ridge Cider Co. – Grant
 Robinette Cellars – Grand Rapids
 Schaefer Cider Company – Conklin, Michigan
 Sierra Rose Ciders – Grand Rapids
 Sietsema Orchards – Ada
 Spicer Orchards Winery – Fenton
 St. Ambrose Cellars – Beulah
 St. Julian Winery – Paw Paw
 Starcut Ciders – Bellaire
 Suttons Bay Ciders – Suttons Bay
 Tandem Ciders – Suttons Bay, Traverse City
 Texas Corners Brewing Company – Kalamazoo
 The Merry-Hearted Cidery – Gladwin
 The Peoples Cider Co. – Grand Rapids
 Townline Ciderworks – Williamsburg
 Twisted Roots Cider – Rogers City
 Two K Farms – Suttons Bay, Michigan
 Uncle John's – St. Johns 
 Vander Mill – Grand Rapids 
 Virtue Cider – Fennville
 Winery at Black Star Farms – Suttons Bay, Michigan

Minnesota
 1910 Sip House – Battle Lake
 Brookview Winery – Milaca
 Duluth Cider – Duluth
 Falconer's Lumberjack Hard Cider – Red Wing
 Harbo Cider – Lake Crystal
 Hoch Orchard Hard Cider – La Crescent
 Loon Juice – Spring Valley
 Milk & Honey Ciders – St. Joseph
 Millner Heritage Winery & Cidery – Kimball
 Minneapolis Cider Company – Minneapolis
 Minnesota Harvest Craft Cider – Jordan
 Montgomery Harvest Premium Cider & Wine – Montgomery
 Number 12 Cider – Minneapolis
 Sawtooth Mountain Cider House - North Shore Winery – Lutsen
 Sociable Cider Werks – Minneapolis
 Sweetland Orchard – Webster
 Thor's Hard Cider – Stillwater
 Urban Forage Winery and Cider House – Minneapolis
 Wild State Cider – Duluth
 Woodlore Cider – Brainerd
 Yellow Belly Cider – Mora

Mississippi
 Backwater Cider Company – Jackson

Missouri
 Black Bear Cider Co. – St. Louis
 Brick River Cider – St. Louis
 Calibration Brewery – North Kansas City
 Cinder Block Brewery – North Kansas City
 Crown Valley Brewing & Distilling – Ste. Genevieve
 KC Cider Co – St. Joseph
 McIntyre Cider - St. James Winery – St. James
 Proper Cider - Schlafly – St. Louis,
 St. James Winery – St. James, St. Charles, Maplewood
 Riverwood Winery – Rushville
 Waves Cider Co. – Columbia

Montana
 Backroad Cider – Hamilton
 Big Mountain Ciderworks - Kallispell
 Last Chance Cider Mill – Billings
 Lockhorn Cider House – Bozeman
 Montana CiderWorks – Darby
 Rough Cut Hard Cider- Kalispell
 Western Cider – Missoula

Nebraska
 CurveBall Hard Cider - James Arthur Vineyards – Raymond
 Glacial Till Vineyard & Winery – Ashland
 SARO Cider – Lincoln
 Papa Moon Ciders – Scottsbluff
 Vala's Orchard Cider – Gretna

Nevada
 Mojave Brewing Company – Henderson
 Stonewise - Cider & Mead – Pahrump
 Vegas Valley Winery – Henderson

New Hampshire
Bradford Bear – Bradford
Butternut Farm – Farmington
Contoocook Cider Company – Contoocook
 Farnum Hill Ciders – Lebanon
 Hermit Woods Winery & Deli – Meredith
 Moonlight Meadery – Londonderry
 North Country Hard Cider – Rollinsford
 Old Settlers Cider – Gilsum
 Pup's Cider – Greenfield
 Silver Mountain Cidery – Lempster
 Stump City Cider – Rochester

New Jersey
 Armageddon Brewing – Somerdale
 Artisan Orchard Hard Cider – Absecon, Cranford, Chester, Freehold, Hammonton, Jobstown, Lambertsville, Mt Holly, Wyckoff
 Beach Bee Meadery – Long Branch
 Burnt Mills Cider – Bedminster
 Ironbound Hard Cider – Asbury
 Melick's – Whitehouse Station
 Painted People Mead and Cider – Millville
 Professor's Hard Cider – Trenton
 Twisted Limb Hard Cider – Stillwater

New Mexico
 Bite Me Hard Cider - Black Mesa Winery – Velarde
 Brew Lab 101 Beer & Cider Co. – Rio Rancho
 Desert Dogs - Boese Brew Co. – Santa Fe
 New Mexico Hard Cider – Santa Fe
 Palmer Brewery and Cider House – Albuquerque
 Sandia Hard Cider – Albuquerque
 Tractor Brewing Company – Albuquerque, Los Lunas

New York
 1911 Hard Cider - Beak & Skiff — Lafayette
 Aaron Burr Cider — Wurtsboro
 Abandoned Hard Cider - Kingston, Red Hook, Woodstock
 ADK Hard Cider — Plattsburgh
 Angry Orchard Cider Company — Walden
 Awestruck Ciders — Sidney
 Bad Seed Cider — Highland
 Becker Farms — Gasport
 Bellwether Hard Cider — Trumansburg
 Big Apple Hard Cider — New York
 Black Diamond Cider — Trumansburg
 BlackBird Cider Works — Barker, Buffalo
 Blackduck Cidery — Ovid
 Blackman Cider Co. — Lockport
 Blue Barn Cidery — Hilton
 Blue Toad Hard Cider — Rochester
 Breezy Hill Orchard and Cider Mill — Staatsburg
 Brooklyn Cider House — New Paltz
 Chateau Buffalo — Buffalo
 Cider Creek Hard Cider — Canisteo
 Clarksburg Cider — Lancaster
 Critz Farms Brewing & Cider Co. — Cazenovia
 Doc's Draft Hard Cider — Warwick
 East Hollow Cider — Petersburg
 Embark Craft Ciderworks — Williamson
 Eve's Cidery — Van Etten
 Fly Creek Cider Mill & Orchard — Fly Creek
 Forthright Cyder and Mead — Youngsville
 Four Grand wine & cidery — Baldwinsville
 Graft Cider — Newburgh
 Green Sun Orchard & Cidery — Sidney Center
 Greenpoint Cidery — Brooklyn
 Grisamore Cider Works — Locke
 Hardscrabble Cider — North Salem
 Hazlitt's Cider Tree — Hector
 Helderberg Meadworks — Esperance
 Hudson Valley Farmhouse Cider — Newburgh
 Indian Ladder Farms Cidery and Brewery — Altamont
 Kettleborough Cider House — New Paltz
 Kings Highway Cider Garden — Millerton
 Kite & String - Finger Lakes Cider House — Interlaken
 Lake Drum Brewing — Geneva
 Left Bank Ciders — Catskill
 Lindner's Cider — Hamden
 McKenzie's Hard Cider — West Seneca
 Melo Moon Cider — Greenwich
 Merchant's Daughter Ciderworks — Purdys
 Metal House Cider — Esopus
 Mountain Mule Ciderhouse — Middleport
 Naked Flock Cider - Applewood Winery — Warwick
 New Leaf Cider Co. — Binghamton
 New York Cider Company — Ithaca
 Nine Pin Cider — Albany
 Oak & Apple — Penfield
 Orchard Hill Cider Mill — New Hampton
 OSB Ciderworks/Original Stump Blower Ciderworks — Lakeville
 Original Sin — New York
 Patriots’ Heritage Cider — Schaghticoke
 Pennings Farm Cidery — Warwick
 Phonograph Cider — Seneca Falls
 Po'Boy Brewery — Jefferson Station
 Red Apple Bombshell Hard Cider — Geneva
 Red Hammer Orchard — Penn Yan
 Redbyrd Orchard Cider — New York, Trumansburg
 Riverhead Ciderhouse — Calverton
 Rockland Cider Works — Orangeburg, Gilboa
 Rootstock Ciderworks — Williamson
 Rose Hill Farm — Red Hook
Scrumpy Ewe Cider - Richmondville
 Seed + Stone Cidery — Rochester
 Seminary Hill Orchard & Cidery — Callicoon
 Slyboro Ciderhouse — Granville
 South Hill Cider — Ithaca
 Star Cider — Canandaigua
 Steampunk Cider — Medina
 Sterling Cidery — Sterling
 Sundström Cider — Hudson
 Thompson's Cider Mill — Croton-On-Hudson
 Treasury Cider — Hopewell Junction
 Wayside Cider — Andes
 Westwind Orchard — Accord
 Windy Hill Cidery and Winery — Castleton-on-Hudson
 Wölffer Estate Vineyard — Sagaponack
 Woodside Orchards — Aquebogue, Riverhead
 Worthog Cider — Penn Yan

North Carolina
 Appalachian Mountain Brewery – Boone
 Appalachian Ridge Artisan Cidery – Hendersonville
 Barn Door Ciderworks – Fletcher
 Black Mountain Ciderworks – Black Mountain
 Blackwater Cider – Windsor
 Bold Rock Hard Cider – Mills River – Asheville Mills River
 Botanist & Barrel – Cedar Grove
 Bull City Ciderworks – Durham
 Chatham Cider Works – Pittsboro
 Fishing Creek Cider Company – Whitakers
 Flat Rock Cider Works – Hendersonville
 Grandfather Vineyard & Winery – Banner Elk
 James Creek Ciderhouse – Cameron
 Jeter Mountain Farm – Hendersonville
 Little Switzerland Orchard and Winery – Burnsville
 McRitchie Winery & Ciderworks – Thurmond
 Molley Chomper Hard Cider – Lansing
 Noble Cider – Asheville
 Red Clay Ciderworks – Charlotte
 Tipsy Hare Ciderworks – Kannapolis
 Urban Orchard Cider Co. – Asheville

North Dakota
 Cottonwood Cider House – Ayr
 Wild Terra Cider – Fargo

Ohio
 5 Penny Hard Cider – Ontario
 Arsenal Cider House – Cleveland
 Bent Ladder – Doylestown
 Cidergeist – Cincinnati
 Dalton Union Winery & Brewery – Marysville
 Dutch Creek Winery – Athens
 Funky Turtle Brewing Company – Toledo
 Mad Moon Craft Cidery – Columbus
 Magis Cider Co. – Cleveland
 Manchester Hill Winery and Vineyard – Circleville
 Redhead Ciderhouse – Berlin Heights
 Rhetoric Brewing Co. – Richwood
 Seek-No-Further Cidery – Granville
 Sons of Toil Brewing – MT Orab
 Spring Hill Cider Works – Geneva
 Sundog Ciderhouse – Columbiana
 The BottleHouse Brewing Company – Cleveland Heights, Lakewood
 The New Frontier Cider Company – Seville
 The New Frontier Cider Company – Seville
 TinCap Cidery – Wilmington
 Twenty One Barrels Hard Cider & Wine – Bradford
 Ugly Bunny Winery – Loudonville
 West End Cider House – Athens

Oklahoma
 OK Cider Co – Oklahoma City

Oregon
 ^5 Cider – Portland
 10 Barrel Brewing – Bend
 12 Bridge Ciderworks – Oregon City
 1859 Cider Co. – Salem
 2 Towns Ciderhouse — Corvallis
 Alter Ego Cider — Portland
 Apple Outlaw — Jacksonville
 Art+Science Winery — Sheridan
 Atlas Cider Co — Bend
 Baird & Dewar Farmhouse Cider — Dayton
 Bandon Rain — Bandon
 Bauman's Cider — Gervais 
 Blue Mountain Cider Company — Milton-Freewater
 Bull Run Cider — Forest Grove
 Carlton Cyderworks — McMinnville
 Cider Riot! — Portland
 Core Alchemy Cider — Hillsboro
 Crush Cider — Hood River
 Doc Fields Cider — Redmond
 Double Mountain Brewery — Hood River
 E.Z. Orchards — Salem
 EdenVale Winery — Medford
 Elk Horn Brewery & Ciderhouse — Eugene
 Freewater Cider Company — Milton-Freewater
 Forest Edge Vineyard — Oregon City
 Fox Tail Cider — Hood River
 Gold Rush Cider — Medford
 Hedgerow Cidery — Dallas
 Hiyu Wine Farm — Hood River
 Hood Valley Hard Cider — Mt Hood
 Hopworks Urban Brewery — Portland
 HR Ciderworks — Hood River
 Logsdon Barrel House & Taproom — Hood River
 McMenamins Edgefield Winery — Troutdale
 Mt View Orchards — Mt Hood
 New West Cider — Portland
 OR\WA Cider Collective — Milwaukie
 Oregon Mead & Cider Co. — Portland
 Ovino Market — Hood River
 Portland Cider Co. — Clackamas
 Queen Orchard — West Linn
 Rack & Cloth — Mosier
 Red Tank Cider — Bend
 Reverend Nat's Hard Cider — Portland
 Rimrock Cider — Bend
 Rivercider — Hood River
 Rogue Ales & Spirits — Newport
 Rookshire Lane Orchards — Eugene
 Runcible Cider — Mosier
 Seven Seeds Seidr — Forest Grove
 Slopeswell Cider Co. — Hood River
 Square Mile Cider Co. — Portland
 Swift Cider — Portland
 Ten Towers Cider Co. — Salem
 The Gorge White House — Hood River
 Tumalo Cider Company — Bend
 Wandering Aengus Ciderworks — Salem
 WildCraft Cider Works — Eugene
 Woodbox Cider Co. — Portland

Pennsylvania
 814 Cider Works — State College
 After the Fall Cider — Rochester
 Arsenal Cider House — Pittsburgh
 Arundel Cellars & Brewing Co. — North East
 Banter's Hard Cider — Stoudsburg
 Bella Terra Vineyards — Hunker
 Big Hill Ciderworks — Gardners
 Blackledge Winery — Center Valley
 Broad Mountain Vineyard — Elizabethville
 Brother Monk Ciderworks — North Cambria
 Bullfrog Brewery — Williamsport
 Chester County Ciders — Westtown
 Civil War Cider — Lewisburg
 Colonel Ricketts Hard Cider — Benton
 Commonwealth Ciders — Philadelphia
 Conneaut Cellars Winery — Conneaut Lake
 Crooked Core Cider — Jeannette
 Deep Roots Hard Cider — Sugar Run
 Dressler Estate — Downingtown
 Five Maidens Cider Company — Bethlehem
 Frecon Farms — Boyertown
 Godfrey Run Farm — Lake City
 Good Intent Cider — Bellefonte
 Grand Illusion Hard Cider — Carlisle
 Hale & True Cider Co — Philadelphia
 Hardball Cider — Mt Bethel
 Innerstoic Wine & Cider Co. — Oregon Hill
 Jack's Hard Cider — Gettysburg
 KingView Mead — Cranberry Township, Mt. Lebanon, Washington
 Knockin Noggin Cidery & Winery — Volant
 Lancaster County Cider — Manheim
 Last Leg Cidery — Fleetville
 Levengoods of Lancaster — Lancaster
 Libations Winery — Mercer
 Maple Lawn Winery & Cider House — New Park
 Moon Dancer Winery & Cider House — Wrightsville
 Old Snappers Hard Cider Co. — Coraopolis
 Old Stone Cider — Lewisville
 Original 13 Ciderworks — Philadelphia
 Ploughman Cider Taproom — Gettysburg
 Red Balloon Cider — Emmaus
 Reid's Winery - Black Bear Hard Cider — Gettysburg
 RAW Urban Winery & Hard Cidery — Stoudsburg
 Space Time Mead & Cider Works — Dunmore
 Stone & Key Cellars — Montgomeryville
 Stone Mountain Winer Cellars — Pine Grove
 Sturges Orchard — Fombell
 Tattiebogle CiderWorks — Acme
 The De Cider — The De Cider
 Threadbare Cider House — Pittsburgh
 Under The Bridge — Lebanon
 Wild Elder Wine and Cider Co. — Jim Thorpe
 Wyndridge Cider Co. — Dallastown
 Young American Hard Cider — Philadelphia

Rhode Island
 Newport Vineyards – Middletown
 Sowams Cider Works Company – Warren
 Tapped Apple Cidery & Winery – Westerly

South Carolina
 Bee-Town Mead & Cider – Bluffton
 Ciclops Cyderi & Brewery – Spartanburg
 Fat Ass Heifer Cidery – Campobello
 Ship's Wheel Hard Cider – North Charleston
 Windy Hill Orchard & Cidery – York

Tennessee
 Brightwood Craft Cider - Nashville
 Diskin Cider - Nashville
 Gypsy Circus Cider Company – Kingsport, Knoxville
 TailGate Cider Company – Nashville
 Tennessee Cider Company – Gatlinburg
 The Apple Barn Cider House – Sevierville
 Wyile Cider – Sevierville

Texas
 Argus Cidery – Austin
 Austin Eastciders – Austin
 Austin Wine & Cider – Austin
 Bishop Cider Company – Dallas
 City Orchard – Houston
 Duo Winery & Cider Co. – Dickinson
 Hye Cider Company – Hye
 Leprechaun Cider Company – Houston
 Permann's Cider Co. – Houston
 Texas Keeper Cider – Manchaca

Utah
 Etta Place Cider – Torrey
 Mountain West Cider Company – Salt Lake City
 Stinger Hard Cider - The Hive Winery – Layton

Vermont
 Boyer's Orchard and Cider Mill – Monkton
 Champlain Orchards Cidery – Shoreham
 Citizen Cider – Burlington
 Cold Hollow Cider Mill – Waterbury
 Eden Specialty Ciders – Newport
 Fable Farm Fermentory – Barnard
 Flag Hill Farm – Vershire
 Little City Cider Co. – Bennington
 Peck Farm Orchard – Montpelier
 Shacksbury – Vergennes
 Silo Distillery – Windsor
 Stowe Cidery – Stowe
 Tin Hat Cider – Roxbury
 Wildbranch Cider – Craftsbury
 Windfall Orchard – Cornwall
 Woodchuck Cider – Middlebury
 Wyder's Cider – Middlebury

Virginia
 Albemarle CiderWorks – North Garden
 Big Fish Cider Company – Monterey
 Blue Bee Cider – Richmond
 Blue Toad Hard Cider – Afton
 Bold Rock Hard Cider – Nellysford, Charlottesville
 Bryant's Cider - Roseland, Richmond
 Buskey Cider – Cape Charles, Richmond
 Capital Hive Meadery – Leesburg
 Castle Hill Cider – Keswick
 Chateau Morrisette – Floyd
 Cider Lab – Sumerduck
 Ciders from Mars – Staunton
 Cobbler Mountain Cellars – Delaplane
 Corcoran Vineyards and Cidery – Waterford
 Courthouse Creek Cider – Maidens
 Coyote Hole Ciderworks – Mineral
 Ditchley Cider Works – Kilmarnock
 Fabbioli Cellars – Leesburg
 Halcyon Days Cider Co – Natural Bridge
 Henway Hard Cider – Bluemont
 Hinson Ford Cider & Mead – Amissville
 Lost Boy Cider – Alexandria
 Monroe Bay Winery – Colonial Beach
 Mt. Defiance Cidery & Distillery – Middleburg
 Old Hill Cider – Timberville
 Old Town Cidery – Winchester
 Old Trade Brewery & Cidery – Brandy Station
 Pen Druid Brewing – Sperryville
 Potter's Craft Cider – Charlottesville
 Pro Re Nata - Crozet
 Sage Bird CiderWorks - Harrisonburg
 Sly Clyde Ciderworks - Hampton
 Son of a Bear Cider - Rapidan
 Stable Craft Brewing - Waynesboro
 Strangeways Brewing - Fredericksburg, Richmond
 Sugar Hill Cidery - Norton
 The Winery at Kindred Pointe - Mt Jackson
 Troddenvale at Oakley Farm - Warm Springs
 Tumbling Creek Cider Company - Abingdon
 West Creek Cider - Richmond
 Wild Hare Hard Cider – Leesburg, Middleburg, Warrington
 Winchester Ciderworks – Winchester

Washington
 Alma Cider – Mount Vernon
 Alpenfire Cider – Port Townsend
 Archibald James Wine & Ciderworks – Leavenworth
 Bad Granny Hard Cider — Chelan
 Bardic Brewing and Cider — Spokane Valley
 Bellingham Cider Company — Bellingham
 BoatHouse CiderWorks — Orcas
 Brownrigg Hard Cider — Seattle
 Bushel & Barrel Ciderhouse — Poulsbo
 Camano Cider — Camano Island
 Channel Marker Cider — Seattle
 Chatter Creek Cider — Woodinville
 Chelan Craft Cider — Chelan
 CiderHead - Honey Moon Mead & Cider — Bellingham
 Cockrell Hard Cider — Puyallup
 Core Hero Hard Cider — Edmonds
 Dragon's Head Cider — Vashon
 Driftwood Hard Cider — Langley
 D's Wicked Cider — Kennewick
 Eaglemount Wine and Cider — Port Townsend
 Elemental Cider Co. — Arlington
 Fierce County Cider — Puyallup
 Finnriver Farm & Cidery — Chimacum
 Goose Ridge Estate Vineyard and Winery — Richland
 Greenbank Cidery — Greenbank
 Greenwood Cider Company — Seattle
 Hammered Dwarf Cider — Snohomish
 Hard Heidi's Cider — Sequim
 Heisen House Vineyards — Battle Ground
 Incline Cider Company — Tacoma
 Independent Cider — Leavenworth
 Inland Cider Mill — Spokane
 Jester & Judge — Stevenson
 Liberty Ciderworks — Spokane
 Locust Cider — Seattle,Gig Harbor,Olympia,Redmond,Spokane,Tacoma,Vancouver,Walla Walla,Woodinville
 Lost Giants Cider Company — Bellingham
 Madrone Cellars & Cider — Friday Harbor
 Manchester Road Cider Company — Chelan
 McMenamins Cider — Seattle
 Methow Valley Ciderhouse — Winthrop
 Mill Haus Cider Co. — Eatonville
 Misfit Island Cider Company — Langley
 Nashi Orchards — Vashon
 Offset Ciderworks — Seattle
 Ole Swede Cider — Tonasket
 One Tree Hard Cider — Spokane
 Pear Up Cider — Wenatchee
 Phillipi Ciderhouse & Distillery — Wenatchee
 Puget Sound Cider Company — Renton
 Ragged & Right Cider Project — Mount Vernon
 Renaissance Orchards — Ferndale, Washington
 Rockridge Orchards & Cidery — Enumclaw
 Rusty Grape Cider — Battle Ground
 Schilling Cider — Seattle
 Seattle Cider Company — Seattle
 Sixknot Cider — Winthrop
 Snowdrift Cider Co. — Wenatchee
 Soundbite Cider — Everett
 Spin Cider — Olalla
 Spire Mountain Ciders — Olympia
 Steelhead Cider — Chelan
 St-Lô Cider — Seattle
 Tart Hard Cider — Olympia
 Three Kees Cider — Snohomish
 Tieton Cider Works — Yakima
 Trailbreaker Cider — Liberty Lake
 Twilight Cider Works — Mead
 Union Hill Cider Co. — East Wenatchee
 Washington Gold Cider — Chelan
 Watercore Cider — Wenatchee
 Westcott Bay Cider — Friday Harbor
 Wheel Line Cider — Ellensburg
 Whitewood Cider Co. — Olympia
 Winsome Ciderworks — Woodinville
 Yonder Cider — Wenatchee

Washington, D.C.
 ANXO Cidery
 Capitol Cider House

West Virginia
 Hawk Knob – Lewisburg
 Swilled Dog – Upper Tract

Wisconsin
 AeppelTreow Winery & Distillery – Burlington
 Brix Cider – Barneveld
 Cider House of Wisconsin – McFarland
 Ciderboys Cider Company – Stevens Point
 Door Peninsula Winery – Sturgeon Bay
 Ela Cider Company – Waterford
 Ferro Farms – Lake Geneva
 Forgotten Fire Winery – Marinette
 Island Orchard Cider – Ellison Bay
 Lost Valley Cider Co. – Milwaukee
 Maiden Rock Winery & Cidery – Stockholm
 Mershon's Artisan Cider – Stoughton
 Restoration Cider Company – Madison
 Rushford Meadery and Winery – Omro
 The Cider Farm – Mineral Point
 Upstream Cider – Stevens Point
 Vines & Rushes Winery – Ripon
 Von Stiehl Winery – Algoma
 White Winter Winery – Iron River
 Forward Cider – Myra

Wyoming
 Farmstead Cider – Jackson

See also
 List of cider brands
 Cider in the United States
 Beer and breweries by region
 Beer in the United States
 List of microbreweries

Notes

 
American cuisine-related lists

Lists of companies of the United States by industry
Cider
Food industry-related lists